Donald Dorman (18 September 1922 – 12 January 1997) was an English professional footballer who played as an inside right or wing half. He made 265 appearances in the Football League playing for Birmingham City, Coventry City and Walsall in the years following the Second World War. He later became a scout.

Life and career
Born in Hall Green, Birmingham, Dorman served as a paratrooper in the 1st Airborne Division during the Second World War. He was wounded and captured at Arnhem and made a prisoner of war. After the war he signed a professional contract with Birmingham City in 1946. He remained at the club for five years, and then joined Coventry City in an exchange deal for Tommy Briggs. At Coventry Dorman scored at a rate of a goal every three games. In 1954 he signed for Walsall, and was their leading scorer in 1956–57, the final season of his playing career.

Dorman then rejoined Birmingham as a scout, and became chief scout when Walter Taylor died. He was responsible for bringing to the club a number of young players who went on to very successful careers, including Kenny Burns, Trevor Francis, Bob and Dave Latchford, Malcolm Page and Garry Pendrey. He and coach Bill Shorthouse acted as caretaker managers at the end of the 1969–70 season while the club sought a replacement after Stan Cullis retired. Dorman left Birmingham when Ron Saunders arrived as manager and took up the post of chief scout at Aston Villa. He died in Worcester in 1997 aged 74.

References

1922 births
1997 deaths
Footballers from Birmingham, West Midlands
English footballers
Association football inside forwards
Association football wing halves
Birmingham City F.C. players
Coventry City F.C. players
Walsall F.C. players
English football managers
Birmingham City F.C. managers
English Football League players
British Army personnel of World War II
British World War II prisoners of war
World War II prisoners of war held by Germany
Paratroopers
Military personnel from Birmingham, West Midlands